Fullmetal Alchemist is an anime series loosely based on the manga of the same title by Hiromu Arakawa. Set in a fictional universe in which alchemy is one of the most advanced scientific techniques, the story follows two alchemist brothers named Edward and Alphonse Elric, who want to recover parts of their bodies lost in an attempt to bring their mother back to life through alchemy.

Produced by Bones and directed by Seiji Mizushima, Fullmetal Alchemist was first aired on TBS Television in Japan from October 4, 2003, to October 2, 2004. It later aired on Cartoon Network's Adult Swim block in the United States from November 7, 2004, through March 19, 2006. A theatrical release titled Fullmetal Alchemist the Movie: Conqueror of Shamballa, a sequel to the television series, premiered in Japanese theaters on July 23, 2005; and it premiered in the U.S. on August 24, 2006. A series of five original video animations (OVAs) were also released. The majority of these OVAs are side stories and do not expand on the plot. In 2009, a new anime, titled Fullmetal Alchemist: Brotherhood for the English release, started broadcast on MBS and TBS, being directed by Yasuhiro Irie. Brotherhood is an independent second anime series adaptation that directly follows all the events of the original manga, and is not related to the first anime series.

The first series has been released in a series of thirteen DVDs from December 17, 2003, to January 26, 2005, in Japan. Funimation also released the same series of DVDs from February 8, 2005, to September 12, 2006, in the United States. MVM had released the first eight volumes in the United Kingdom; however, Funimation gave the rights over to Revelation Films. In March 2006 a DVD featuring the OVAs was released in Japan with the name of Fullmetal Alchemist: Premium Collection. Funimation acquired and dubbed the Premium Collection, which was released on August 4, 2009. During January from 2009, Bones released a "DVD box archives" of the anime. It includes the first anime of 51 episodes, the film, the CD soundtracks, and guidebooks from the series.

Eight pieces of theme music are used for the episodes—four opening themes and four ending themes. Each of the theme songs was performed by artists under Sony Music Entertainment Japan's label, whose anime distribution unit, Aniplex, handled the production and music production for the series. The music score was composed and arranged by Michiru Oshima. "Melissa" by Porno Graffitti is used during episodes 2–13, "Ready Steady Go" by L'Arc-en-Ciel is used during episodes 14–25, "Undo" by Cool Joke is used during episodes 26–41, and "Rewrite" by Asian Kung-Fu Generation is used for the last 10 episodes. For episode 1, the ending is "Melissa" by Porno Graffitti.  by Nana Kitade is used for episodes 2–13,  by Yellow Generation is used for episodes 14–25, episodes 26–41 use "Motherland" by Crystal Kay for the ending, and "I Will" by Sowelu is used for episodes 42–50. All episodes that originally opened with "Melissa" and "Undo" had "Ready Steady Go" shown in place of those songs on Cartoon Network's Adult Swim and YTV's Bionix. The DVD releases from Funimation include all openings in their original places and format.


Episode list

OVAs

Home media release

Japanese

English

References
Specific

General

External links
The official North American website for the anime series 

Episodes
Fullmetal Alchemist